Paul Mendez (born in 1982) is a Black British author based in London. He wrote the 2020 semi-autobiographical novel, Rainbow Milk.

Biography 
Mendez was born in the West Midlands to a second generation Jamaican-British family. He was raised as a Jehovah's Witness. He left his parents' house when he was seventeen and eventually moved to Tonbridge to study engineering at the University of Greenwich. He dropped out after nine months but remained in Kent before moving to Birmingham in 2003. He moved to London in 2004 to study acting, and became a sex worker.

In 2012, he met Sharmaine Lovegrove at a party and when she became a publisher at Dialogue Books, Mendez sent her the manuscript which would become his debut novel, Rainbow Milk.

He is studying for an MA in Black British Literature from Goldsmiths. As of 2020, he was in a relationship with novelist Alan Hollinghurst.

References

English LGBT writers
Black British writers
LGBT Black British people
Living people
21st-century British male writers
1982 births